Carmine is a surname.  Notable people with the name include:
Michael Carmine (1959–1989), American actor
Laura Carmine (born 1983), Puerto Rican-born actress 
Fictional characters
 Anthony Carmine, character from Gears of War video game
 Benjamin Carmine, Anthony Carmine's younger brother in Gears of War 2
 Clayton Carmine, Anthony Carmine and Benjamin Carmine's older brother in Gears of War 3

See also
Renato De Carmine (1923–2010) Italian actor
Samuel Di Carmine (born 1988), Italian footballer
Carmin (disambiguation), includes list of people with name Carmin